The GE U36C was a 3600 hp diesel-electric locomotive model built by GE Transportation Systems.

The U36C also had steel capped pistons. 

218 units were produced between October 1971 and February 1975 for railroads in the United States and Mexico. A further 20 units of model U36CG (the passenger service variant of the U36C) were built for use in Mexico.

Rebuilds
Between 1985-1987 Santa Fe's Cleburne shops rebuilt 70 U36Cs #8700-8769 into C30-7 standards and were reclassified as SF30Cs. As of 2022, Unit 9501 has been donated to the Arizona State Railroad Museum.

Original Owners

References

External links

 Sarberenyi, Robert. GE U34CH, U36C, and U36CG Original Owners.

U36C
C-C locomotives
Diesel-electric locomotives of the United States
Freight locomotives
Standard gauge locomotives of the United States
Railway locomotives introduced in 1971